Nadiya Didenko (born March 7, 1986 in Ivano-Frankivsk) is a Ukrainian freestyle skier, specializing in aerials .

Career
Didenko competed at the 2006 and 2010 Winter Olympics for Ukraine. Her best finish came in 2010, placing 13th in the qualifying round of the aerials, failing to advance to the final. In 2006, she placed 8th.

As of April 2013, her best showing at the World Championships is 9th, in 2013.

Didenko made her World Cup debut in February 2005. As of April 2013, she has one World Cup podium finish, taking silver at Bukovel in 2012/13. Her best World Cup overall finish in aerials is 7th, in 2010/11 and 2012/13.

Performances

World Cup

Podiums

Positions

References

1986 births
Living people
Olympic freestyle skiers of Ukraine
Freestyle skiers at the 2006 Winter Olympics
Freestyle skiers at the 2010 Winter Olympics
Sportspeople from Ivano-Frankivsk
Ukrainian female freestyle skiers